Rajwade and Sons (Marathi: "राजवाडे अॅण्ड सन्स") is a 2015 Marathi language family drama film. The movie is directed by Sachin Kundalkar. The film is produced by Y.M.Deosthalee, Atul Kulkarni and Sachin Kundalkar under studio Kaffe Kamera. It stars Amitriyaan, Atul Kulkarni, Sachin Khedekar, Mrinal Kulkarni, Siddharth Menon, Alok Rajwade, Mrinmayee Godbole, Krutika Deo. The film had its theatrical release on 16 October 2015.

The movie had its world television premier on 18 December 2016 on Star Pravah.

Plot
The movie follows the story of cousins Anay, Shweta, Ananya and Virajas, the youngest generation of the rich and powerful Rajwade family in Pune. They each wish to follow their own dreams, but their grandfather, the head of the family, has other plans for them. But the story takes a sudden twist when their young uncle Vikram Rajwade enters their life mysteriously out of nowhere. Vikram encourages each one of them to fight, argue and question the limitations set for these kids, Making them aware to live their dreams. Rajwade and Sons is the story of a happy joint family who want to find a way to stay together, in the ever-changing modern times.

Cast 
 Amitriyaan as Vikram Rajwade
 Siddharth Menon as Virajas Vaibhav Joshi
 Alok Rajwade as Anay Vidyadhar Rajwade 
 Mrinmayee Godbole as Ananya Vaibhav Joshi 
 Krutika Deo as Shweta Vidyadhar Rajwade
 Suhani Dhadphale as Tanmaya Shubhankar Rajwade
 Atul Kulkarni as Shubhankar Rajwade
 Sachin Khedekar as Vidyadhar Rajwade
 Mrinal Kulkarni as Laxmi Rajwade Joshi 
 Satish Alekar as Ramesh Rajwade
 Jyoti Subhash as Sushila Rajwade 
 Pournima Manohar as Sarita Vidyadhar Rajwade
 Rahul Mehendale as Vaibhav Vasant Joshi
 Lalit Prabhakar voiceover for Vikram Rajwade role

Critical response
Mihir Banage of The Times of India rated it a 3.5 out of 5 and went on to say "..Most of the cast members have a solid theatre background and their grasp of the situations is fantastic...[The movie] has ample twists and symbolism that identifies with the issues of today...". Ganesh Matkari of Pune Mirror rated the movie 4 stars out of 5 and went on to say "...The entire cast acts in unison to deliver a powerful performance....".

References

External links 
 

2015 films
Indian drama films
2010s Marathi-language films
Films directed by Sachin Kundalkar